Antaeotricha particularis is a moth in the family Depressariidae. It was described by Philipp Christoph Zeller in 1877. It is found in Panama.

References

Moths described in 1877
particularis
Moths of Central America